Lewisville is an unincorporated community in Polk County, Oregon, United States, named for 1845 pioneer David R. Lewis. Its post office opened in 1868 and closed in 1905. Nothing remains of the community.

References

Unincorporated communities in Polk County, Oregon
Ghost towns in Oregon
1868 establishments in Oregon
Populated places established in 1868
Unincorporated communities in Oregon